Lygisaurus curtus is a species of skink found in Papua New Guinea.

References

Lygisaurus
Reptiles described in 1897
Reptiles of Papua New Guinea
Endemic fauna of Papua New Guinea
Taxa named by George Albert Boulenger
Skinks of New Guinea